Snow Patrol are a Scottish rock band formed in 1994 in Dundee, Scotland. They consist of Gary Lightbody (vocals, guitar), Nathan Connolly (guitar, backing vocals), Paul Wilson (bass guitar, backing vocals), Jonny Quinn (drums), and Johnny McDaid (piano, guitar, backing vocals). Initially an indie rock band, Snow Patrol rose to prominence in the early– mid-2000s as part of the post-Britpop movement.

The band were founded at the University of Dundee in 1994 by Lightbody, Mark McClelland, and Michael Morrison of Shrug. After briefly using the name Polarbear, releasing the EP Starfighter Pilot (1997) and losing Morrison as a member, the band became Snow Patrol in 1997 and added Quinn to its lineup. Their first two studio albums, Songs for Polarbears (1998) and When It's All Over We Still Have to Clear Up (2001), released by the independent record label Jeepster Records, were commercially unsuccessful. The band then signed to the major record label Polydor Records in 2002.

Connolly joined Snow Patrol in 2002, and after their major-label debut album, Final Straw, the following year, with "Run", the album's biggest hit, the band rose to national fame. The album was certified 5× platinum in the UK. Their next studio album, Eyes Open (2006), and its hit single, "Chasing Cars"—reported in 2019 to be the most-played song of the 21st century on UK radio—propelled the band to greater international fame. The album topped the UK Albums Chart and was the best-selling British album of the year. In 2008, Snow Patrol released their fifth studio album, A Hundred Million Suns; then, in 2009, they released their first compilation album, Up to Now; and, in 2011, their sixth studio album, Fallen Empires, was published. The band released their seventh album, Wildness, on 25 May 2018.

During the course of their career, Snow Patrol have won seven Meteor Ireland Music Awards and been nominated for six Brit Awards and one Grammy. Final Straw, Eyes Open, and A Hundred Million Suns have sold ten million copies worldwide, combined.

History

Early years (1994–1997)

Snow Patrol were originally formed in early 1994 by University of Dundee students Gary Lightbody, Mark McClelland, and Michael Morrison under the name Shrug. The band started by performing gigs at the university and surrounding pubs such as Lucifer's Mill. Their first EP was entitled The Yogurt vs. Yoghurt Debate. In 1996, they changed their name to Polarbear to avoid issues with any American bands that were also named Shrug. Shortly afterwards, drummer Michael Morrison left the group after suffering a breakdown and returned to Northern Ireland. In mid-1997, Polarbear released a three-track EP, Starfighter Pilot, on the Electric Honey label. The band again renamed, this time to Snow Patrol in 1997, because of a naming conflict with a band named Polar Bear, fronted by ex-Jane's Addiction bassist Eric Avery.

Songs for Polarbears and When It's All Over We Still Have to Clear Up (1997–2001)

Snow Patrol joined independent label Jeepster in 1997. Jeepster had the same idea for Snow Patrol as the approach they had with Belle & Sebastian, who had become popular by word of mouth, without heavy promotion. The band were happy to be associated with an indie label, because it provided them greater independence than a major label would. At that time, they were quoted as saying Jeepster wouldn't expect them to have a strict work ethic or focus too much on promotional efforts.

Snow Patrol's debut album, Songs for Polarbears, was released in 1998 after the band had started living in Glasgow. Lightbody was then working at the Nice n Sleazy's Bar in Sauchiehall Street. The album was a critical success but did not make any impact commercially. The same year, the band came close to getting featured in a worldwide advertisement for Philips. Gomez was ultimately signed. In 1999, Snow Patrol won the "Phil Lynott Award for Best New Band" by Irish music magazine Hot Press. In 2001, still living in Glasgow, the trio followed up with When It's All Over We Still Have to Clear Up. Like its predecessor, the album was praised by critics but did not sell.

The band began to work harder and tour more. They slept on fans' floors after concerts and pretended to be members of Belle & Sebastian to get into nightclubs. They owed rent to their landlords and used to receive regular visits and letters from them when on tour. After the failure of the second album, Snow Patrol began to realise that the label's lax attitude towards management and record promotion, qualities that had initially attracted them to Jeepster, was likely holding them back. The band's manager at the time was Danny McIntosh. Lightbody has described him as "the angriest man in pop: great, great man". He has said that he loved the band "with every atom in his body" and was never angry towards them. Lightbody has credited their manager with keeping the band together in those years. McIntosh had a gold-coloured splitter bus, in which the band used to travel to play concerts.

Jeepster dropped Snow Patrol in 2001, a decision that was criticised by Hot Press magazine as brainless. By July 2001, many major labels had started showing interest in the band, who were cash-strapped and had no record deal. Lightbody sold a major part of his record collection to raise money to keep the band going. The singer calls the time "miserable" but he was confident they would get signed to another label quickly. However, the music scene in the United Kingdom had turned its attention to American bands, and British bands were not getting signed. The group spent this time constantly writing songs. Lightbody, bored at this point, assembled The Reindeer Section, a Scottish supergroup, and found a record label to release the project's recordings. Quinn said that though the time was hard for everyone involved except for Nathan, the question of splitting up never arose. It was during this time the band wrote "Run" (which had been around since 2000) in a room on an acoustic guitar, which later became the band's breakthrough single. The band's "low point" came when they played a concert to eighteen people at a popular strip club in High Wycombe. The show took place in a shoddy VIP area, and the management had to unscrew poles used by pole dancers to make space for the band to play, something that Gary would later joke about whilst performing at a sold-out Wembley Arena. Quinn calls the show "horrendous". Desperate for attention, the band raised £200 to nominate themselves for a Mercury Prize but failed to get shortlisted.

Final Straw (2002–2005)
In 2002, Snow Patrol began to be managed and published by Jazz Summers of Big Life.

Guitarist Nathan Connolly, previously a member of the band File Under Easy Listening, had been working in an HMV store room in Belfast at the time. Connolly and the band had a mutual friend, who introduced them to him. Connolly moved to Glasgow to join Snow Patrol in the spring of 2002.

During Lightbody and McClelland's years at the University of Dundee, they had been noticed by Richard Smernicki, a senior student. Richard's brother Paul had come to know the band as well. Richard graduated in 1996, two years before Lightbody and McClelland, to become Polydor's Scottish A&R representative. Paul became Polydor's Press and Artist Development Manager and Fiction's label manager. Later, Jim Chancellor, an A&R executive for Fiction, and fellow talent scout Alex Close, approached Snow Patrol in Glasgow to listen to their demos, and judged them on "the quality of the songs", according to Lightbody. Chancellor introduced them to producer Jacknife Lee, who despite having been a guitarist in 1990s punk rock band Compulsion, had no rock production experience at that point, being known instead for his work with Basement Jaxx and Eminem.

Final Straw was released on 4 August 2003, under Black Lion, a subsidiary of Polydor Records. Its music was along the same lines as the band's first two albums, and no attempt was made to change the sound to something more radio-friendly. The release of Final Straw in the US in 2004 saw the album sell more than 250,000 copies and become the 26th-most popular album in the UK of that year. The album was eventually certified five-times platinum in the UK. In mid-2005, during their tour to support Final Straw, the band toured with U2 as an opening act on the Vertigo Tour in Europe. That summer also saw Snow Patrol playing a short set in London at the worldwide benefit concert Live 8. After finishing their opening act duties and extensive two-year tour of Final Straw in late July, the band took a few weeks off and began writing and recording songs for a new album. Snow Patrol's new version of John Lennon's "Isolation" was released on 10 December 2005 as part of the Amnesty International campaign Make Some Noise. The song was later issued on the 2007 John Lennon tribute album, Instant Karma: The Amnesty International Campaign to Save Darfur.

Eyes Open and worldwide success (2005–2007)

On 16 March 2005, McClelland left the band, with Lightbody stating, "a whole new set of new and unexpected pressures...have unfortunately taken their toll on working relationships within the band, and it was felt the band could not move forward with Mark as a member." At the end of March 2005, former Terra Diablo member Paul Wilson was announced as the official replacement for McClelland, and Snow Patrol also declared longtime touring keyboardist Tom Simpson an official member of the band.

Snow Patrol completed the recording of Eyes Open in December 2005, with Jacknife Lee returning for production. The album was released on 28 April 2006 in Ireland and 1 May 2006 in the UK, with the first UK single, "You're All I Have", coming out on 24 April 2006. The record was released in North America on 9 May. While "Hands Open" was the first American single, "Chasing Cars" pushed its way onto the download and pop charts after it was heard during an emotional scene of the second-season finale of the television show Grey's Anatomy on 15 May 2006. On 23 July 2006, "Chasing Cars" had the distinction of being the last song performed live on the BBC's Top of the Pops. The song peaked at number 6 on the UK Singles Chart and number 5 on the US Billboard Hot 100.

On 26 November 2006, Eyes Open had become the best-selling album of 2006 in the UK, selling 1.5 million copies. It was also the 15th best-selling album of the 2000s and is one of the best-selling albums in UK chart history.

At the 2007 Grammy Awards, "Chasing Cars" was nominated for Best Rock Song and at the 2007 Brit Awards, the song was nominated for Best British Single. 1 September 2007 saw Snow Patrol headlining a "homecoming" mini-festival in Lightbody and Jonny Quinn's home town of Bangor, County Down. Around 30,000 people came to see the band.

A Hundred Million Suns (2008–2009)
Lightbody stated that recording for the follow-up to Eyes Open was to begin in Autumn 2006, with Jacknife Lee returning a third time for production.

The band kicked off their Taking Back the Cities Tour on 26 October 2008. Singer Miriam Kaufmann toured with the band and sang backing vocals, most notably on "Set the Fire to the Third Bar", which originally featured Martha Wainwright. The UK & Ireland Arena Tour ended on 23 March. The final show was played at the Odyssey in Belfast to a 9,000-strong crowd, including family and friends of the band, and the Northern Irish football squad. It was also reported that the band played to an estimated 200,000 fans during the tour.

Snow Patrol next visited South Africa to play a few dates at the Coca-Cola Zero Festival, supporting Oasis, before beginning a European leg of the tour. In June, they supported Coldplay for a month on the Viva la Vida Tour.

The band also released a compilation album featuring tracks from their fifteen-year history, Up to Now, on 9 November 2009. It includes thirty tracks spanning two CDs, of which three are new songs. "Just Say Yes", a track written by Lightbody and earlier recorded by Pussycat Doll Nicole Scherzinger and X Factor star Diana Vickers, was released as the lead single on 2 November. The album additionally contains covers and rarities, including songs from the band's side project, The Reindeer Section. Snow Patrol expressed wishes to make a tour documentary in the future, along the lines of U2's Rattle and Hum.

In December 2009, the PPL announced "Chasing Cars" was the most-played song of the decade in the UK. The same month, in a UK poll conducted by Channel 4, it was voted the nation's favourite "song of the noughties". In January 2010, the band were nominated in three categories in the annual Meteor Awards. They also played at the event, on 19 February 2010 at The RDS.

Fallen Empires (2010–2012)
In 2009, Snow Patrol stated they would enter their "next phase" with the release of their sixth album. The band took a new musical direction, and Connolly advised fans to keep an open mind regarding the new material. On 12 January 2011, Lightbody launched a blog to give details about the progress of the band's next release.

Snow Patrol released the single "Called Out in the Dark" (remixed by Fatboy Slim) for radio airplay on 21 July 2011 on BBC Radio 1 on Zane Lowe's radio show. According to official sources, the single itself would be released independently and as part of an EP later on and the UK release date was said to be 4 September. More details on the EP were announced on 3 August, when the group's website revealed the artwork and track list contents. Along with the new single, the release contained three new tracks, entitled "My Brothers", "I'm Ready", and "Fallen Empires". In addition, it was revealed that the EP was intended to be a digital release limited to the UK and Ireland.

Shortly after the premiere of the new lead single, the quintet's official website confirmed the news that the name of the new album would be Fallen Empires. Fallen Empires was released on 14 November 2011 in the UK and was launched at O2 Shepherd's Bush Empire. Singer-songwriter Johnny McDaid, after being involved in the album as a guest musician and songwriter, would then join the band on the subsequent tour and eventually become a full member of Snow Patrol.

The second single from Fallen Empires was "This Isn't Everything You Are", released on 13 November 2011.

Greatest Hits (2013–2018)
The band released a compilation entitled Greatest Hits on 14 May 2013.

Snow Patrol headlined the Tennent's Vital festival in August 2013 and performed a special warm-up show in London before the festival. After the show, they announced that Simpson would be leaving the band.

Wildness (2018–present)

The follow-up to Fallen Empires was initially due for release in 2016. Lightbody told NME that he had to overcome a bout of writer's block and that the songs written for the new album were scrapped before being replaced by new "mind-boggling" material.

On 28 January 2018, the band's social media announced the upcoming release of their seventh studio album, entitled Wildness, which was published on 25 May 2018.

In November 2018, they released an EP, What If This Is All the Love You Ever Get?, featuring remixes of the track of the same name from Wildness. The band released their third compilation album, Reworked, on 8 November 2019, and followed it up with a tour.

Contributions
In 2009, Snow Patrol curated the 22nd album in the Late Night Tales series of mix albums. The band covered the INXS song "New Sensation" for the occasion. Lightbody has also spoken of plans to release songs from the Listen... Tanks! project (with Snow Patrol producer Jacknife Lee) and Tired Pony, a country group.
In 2014, the band contributed a new song, "I Won't Let You Go", to the soundtrack for the film Divergent.

Appearances
On 30 July 2006, Snow Patrol appeared on the finale of the long-running BBC music show Top of the Pops, performing "Chasing Cars". The band were the last act to appear on the show.

On 7 July 2007, they performed at the UK leg of Live Earth at Wembley Stadium, London. Shortly after their performance, Simpson was arrested at RAF Northolt for missing a court date in Glasgow, having been charged with possession of cocaine.

Other ventures
Snow Patrol founded Polar Music, a publishing company run through Kobalt Music. The venture is independent from the band's publishing deal with Universal Music. Polar Music was planned to sign artists regardless of their genre, as drummer Jonny Quinn explained: "there is no agenda—if it's good enough and we believe in it 110%, we will sign it." Quinn, and his fellow band members Connolly and Lightbody, are acting as A&R. The company's first signing was Johnny McDaid, previously of the Northern Irish band Vega4. Quinn has said that they wish to sign artists to a one-album deal and do not want to put undue pressure on the artists with bigger, multi-year contracts. Polar Music had its initial chart hit in the first week of October 2009.

Gary Lightbody and Tom Simpson are both fans of the football club Dundee F.C. In 2008, they met the club's board of directors to find ways to financially help the struggling club. The band also owns a stake in the Houndstooth Pub in New York City.

Philanthropy
On 25 November 2007, Snow Patrol performed an acoustic session for the charity Mencap at Union Chapel, Islington. They were one of the main bands to take part in the project, called "Little Noise Sessions", which was curated by Jo Whiley.

In 2009, Lightbody and Connolly donated plectrums and certificates to the Music Beats Mines project, which aims to clear unexploded mines/landmines from conflict zones. The items were auctioned on eBay.

Recognition
Other musicians, such as Ozzy Osbourne, Bono, Michael Stipe, and Nikki Sixx, have expressed admiration for Snow Patrol. Terri Hooley, founder of the Good Vibrations label and a lifelong supporter of local Northern Irish music, has expressed pride in bands like Snow Patrol.

Awards and nominations

"Chasing Cars" was voted the song of the decade on Channel 4's programme The Song of the Decade, which was broadcast on 28 December 2009. On 30 December 2009, Phonographic Performance Limited announced "Chasing Cars" was the most-played song of the decade in the UK. Ten years later in 2019, it was reportedly still the most played song of the 21st century in the UK.

In June 2010, the band were commemorated with a Heritage Award by PRS for Music. A plaque was erected on the Duke of York pub in Belfast, where Snow Patrol performed their first gig. The band were the sixth to receive the award, with all its members turning out. They later performed a live set to a small crowd of around thirty people.

Band members

Current
 Gary Lightbody – lead vocals, rhythm guitar, piano, keyboards (1994–present)
 Nathan Connolly – lead guitar, backing vocals (2002–present)
 Johnny McDaid – keyboards, rhythm guitar, backing vocals (2011–present)
 Paul Wilson – bass, backing vocals (2005–present)
 Jonny Quinn – drums, percussion (1997–present)

Touring musicians
 Richard Colburn – keyboards, drums, guitars, percussion (1996–1997, 2008–present)
 Iain Archer – guitar, backing vocals (2001–present)
 Colm MacAthlaoich – trumpet (2001–present)
 Miriam Kaufmann – backing vocals (2006–2007, 2008–present)
 Troy Stewart – guitar (2008–present)

Former
 Mark McClelland – bass, keyboards, piano (1994–2005)
 Michael Morrison – drums (1994–1996)
 Tom Simpson – keyboards, piano, samples (2005–2013)

Timeline

Discography

 Songs for Polarbears (1998)
 When It's All Over We Still Have to Clear Up (2001)
 Final Straw (2003)
 Eyes Open (2006)
 A Hundred Million Suns (2008)
 Fallen Empires (2011)
 Wildness (2018)

Concert tours

References

External links

 
 Michael Morrison's tribute page to Shrug

 
Ivor Novello Award winners
Musical groups established in 1994
Scottish alternative rock groups
Scottish indie rock groups
Indie rock groups from Northern Ireland
Alternative rock groups from Northern Ireland
Fiction Records artists
Polydor Records artists
Post-Britpop groups
Musical quintets
Interscope Records artists
1994 establishments in the United Kingdom
University of Dundee